The 2007 International Formula Master was the inaugural International Formula Master series season. The season started on the weekend of May 18–20 at Valencia, and served as a support series to the World Touring Car Championship in all the latter's European races except Zandvoort, Netherlands.

Teams and drivers

Race calendar

Championship Standings

Drivers

Teams

References

International Formula Master seasons
International Formula Master
International Formula Master